The Paektusan Ch'ŏngnyŏn Line is an electrified standard-gauge secondary mainline of the Korean State Railway running from Kilju on the P'yŏngra Line to Hyesan on the Pukbunaeryuk Line; it connects to the narrow gauge Paengmu Line at Paeg'am Ch'ŏngnyŏn Station, and to the Samjiyŏn Line at Wiyŏn Ch'ŏngnyŏn Station.

Description
This line traverses a very mountainous area; it has a ruling grade of 33‰ and a minimum curve radius of 250 metres. Service facilities on the line are at Hyesan for locomotives and at Wiyŏn and Paeg'am for rolling stock.

History 
In order to exploit the Paektusan region's abundant forest and mineral resources, the Yanggang Forest Development Railway planned construction of a line, dubbed Hambuk Line, running from Kilju to Hyesanjin (now Hyesan Ch'ŏngnyŏn) via Hapsu, along with a branch from Hapsu to Komusan, already at the beginning of the 1920s. The Yanggang Forest Development Railway was one of six privately owned railway companies that merged to create the Chosen Railway on 1 September 1923, but work on the planned line was not started before the Chosen Government Railway (Sentetsu) took over the project. Sentetsu finally began construction of the line in May 1931, with the first section,  from Kilju to Hapsu, being opened on 1 November 1933.

Originally called the Kilhye Line (from the names of the two termini, Kilju and Hyesan), the line received its present name in 1978, when electrification of the line was completed in September of that year.

The planned Komusan–Musan section, using the Hambuk Line name, was finally opened in 1937 by the North Chosen Colonial Railway (a subsidiary of the Chosen Railway), whilst the section between Musan and the Kilhye Line (at Paegam instead of Hapsu as had been planned and named Paengmu Line) was finally completed as a narrow gauge railway by Sentetsu on 1 December 1944.

When the Pukbunaeryuk Line was completed to Hyesan in 1988, a northern east-west connection was finally established connecting the Manp'o Line at Manp'o Ch'ŏngnyŏn to the Paektusan Ch'ŏngnyŏn Line.

On 9 October 2006 an underground nuclear test was conducted at Punggye-ri Nuclear Test Site in Kilju County, causing the closure of the line for 3-4 months after the Paegam tunnel, near Paegam Ch'ŏngnyŏn station, collapsed.

Services

Freight
Ore and forest products account for almost 93% of freight traffic in the direction towards Kilju, while almost half of the freight in the direction towards Hyesan is coal.

Ore is shipped from Namgye, talc, kaolin and magnesite from Simp'o-ri, and iron sulphide from Unhŭng. Logs are brought from the Paengmu Line to Paegam and forwarded to a large sawmill at Wiyŏn; raw logs are also shipped to the pulp mill and plywood factory in Kilju. The majority of freight moved on the line in the direction towards Hyesan is coal from Sinmyŏngch'ŏn on the P'yŏngra Line destined for use by residents and power plants in the region, along with grains, anthracite, fertiliser, cement etc. for local use.

Passenger

Passenger traffic on the Paektusan Ch'ŏngnyŏn line is significant, with much of that traffic being for visitors to the various "historic sites of the Revolution" in the region. There are also trains for local travellers, including connection to trains on the Samjiyŏn Line.

The following passenger trains are known to operate on this line:

 Express trains 1/2, operating between P'yŏngyang and Hyesan Ch'ŏngnyŏn, run along this line along its entirety between Kilju and Hyesan;
 Express trains 3/4, operating between West P'yŏngyang and Hyesan Ch'ŏngnyŏn, run along this line along its entirety between Kilju and Hyesan;
 Semi-express trains 101/102 operate between Kilju Ch'ŏngnyŏn and Hyesan;
 Semi-express trains 104-107/108-111, operating between Haeju Ch'ŏngnyŏn and Hyesan Ch'ŏngnyŏn, run along the entirety of this line between Kilju and Hyesan;
 Local trains 652/653 operate between Hyesan Ch'ŏngnyon and Taeoch'ŏn.

Route
A yellow background in the "Distance" box indicates that section of the line is not electrified.

Mainline

References

Railway lines in North Korea
Standard gauge railways in North Korea